Coudekerque-Village is a former commune of the Nord department in northern France. On 1 January 2016, it was merged into the new commune Téteghem-Coudekerque-Village. Prior to October 6, 2008, it was known as Coudekerque (Koudekerke). The name was changed to distinguish it from Coudekerque-Branche.

Heraldry

See also
Communes of the Nord department

References

Former communes of Nord (French department)
French Flanders